Giorgi Vazagashvili (born 19 April 1974) is a Georgian judoka. At the 2000 Summer Olympics he won the bronze medal in the men's Half Lightweight (60–66 kg) category, together with Girolamo Giovinazzo of Italy. Vazagashvili is silver medalist world champion at Tokyo 1995, bronze medalist Hamilton 1993, bronze medalist Paris 1997. Two times European champion in Hague 1996,  Oostende 1997, silver medalist in Birmingham 1995, bronze medalist in Bratislava 1999. He is World Junior Champion in Cairo 1994, in final he won against Tadahiro Nomura. European Junior Champion in Arnhem 1993. Vazagashvili is champion of international tournament in Tbilisi 1992, 1993, Moscow 1993, 1997, Prague 1996, Munich 1997, Warsaw 2000, bronze medalist in Paris 1995, bronze medalist Matsutaro Shoriki Cup Tokyo 1998.

References

External links
 
 

1974 births
Living people
Male judoka from Georgia (country)
Judoka at the 1996 Summer Olympics
Judoka at the 2000 Summer Olympics
Olympic judoka of Georgia (country)
Olympic bronze medalists for Georgia (country)
Olympic medalists in judo
Georgian people of Greek descent
Medalists at the 2000 Summer Olympics
Judoka at the 2004 Summer Olympics